A whistle stop is a stopping point at which trains stop only on request.

Whistle Stop or Whistle-Stop may also refer to:

 Whistle Stop (1946 film), starring George Raft and Ava Gardner
 Whistle Stop (1963 film) (Russian: Полустанок) a Soviet comedy directed by Boris Barnet
 Whistle Stop (album), a 1961 jazz studio album by Kenny Dorham
 "Whistle Stop", a 1994 episode of L.A. Law
 "Whistle Stop", a 2010 episode of In Plain Sight
 Whistle Stop, a fictional town in the novel Fried Green Tomatoes at the Whistle Stop Cafe and later film adaptation
 "Whistle-Stop", a song by Roger Miller from the 1973 Disney film Robin Hood

See also
 Whistle stop train tour, a style of political campaign